Hugues Panassié (27 February 1912 in Paris – 8 December 1974 in Montauban) was a French critic, record producer, and impresario of traditional jazz.

Career 
Panassié was born in Paris.  When he was fourteen, he was stricken with polio, which limited his extracurricular physical activities. He took up the saxophone and fell in love with jazz in the late 1920s. Panassié was the founding president of the Hot Club de France in 1932. He produced recording sessions in New York featuring Mezz Mezzrow and Tommy Ladnier from November 1938 to January 1939.

During World War II, the Germans occupied the northern half of France beginning June 1940. The Nazis regarded jazz as low music — music from an inferior people. Jacques Demêtre, in the 2014 book by Steve Cushing, Pioneers of the Blues Revival, said that people had expected the Germans to ban jazz entirely. But instead, they only banned American jazz and American tunes.  Demetre explained that many American standards were in French with alternate titles. Panassié, for example, managed to keep broadcasting American jazz on his radio station submitting to censors obtuse French translations of American song titles, and even relabeling records.  Panassié's friend Mezz Mezzrow describes a particular example in his 1946 autobiography Really the Blues:

 "[The Nazi censors] were shown a record labeled "La Tristesse de Saint Louis," which translates the "Sadness of Saint Louis," and Panassié offered the explanation that it was a sad song written about poor Louis the Ninth, lousy with that old French tradition. What Cerberus didn't know was that underneath the phony label was a genuine RCA Victor one giving Louis Armstrong as the recording artist and stating the real name of the number: "The Saint Louis Blues."

Selected controversies
In a changing world of jazz, Panassié was an ardent exponent of traditional jazz — strictly Dixieland.  He harbored a particular love of style similar to that of Louis Armstrong from the 1930s. Panassié criticized West Coast jazz as inauthentic, partly because most musicians were white and also sounded white. In his book, The Real Jazz, Panassié ranked Benny Goodman as a detestable clarinetist whose sterile intonation was inferior to black players Jimmy Noone and Omer Simeon. Mezz Mezzrow became Panassié's lone example of a white musician who played jazz authentically. Panassié dismissed bebop as "a form of music distinct from jazz."

In 1974, he accused Miles Davis, Archie Shepp, Pharoah Sanders, and others as being "traitors to the cause of true black music," that, according to Panassié, they claimed to support.

Some historians opine that Panassié hurt musicians by creating a wedge between blacks and whites by his insistence that black jazz was superior. Some authors ridicule his harsh attacks against more open jazz critics, who he characterized in his Bulletin du Hot Club de France as being full of "crass ignorance," "thick incompetence," and "triumphant stupidity."  His ad hominem attacks included phrases that translate to "repugnant glavioteur," "formidable imbecile," and "donkey of the pen."

Political views 
In addition to being a strong exponent of Dixieland jazz, and a harsh critic of jazz musicians who strayed from it, Panassié was a far-right monarchist who belonged to the anti-Semitic organisation Action Française and wrote a jazz column for the extreme-right magazine L'Insurgé.

Discography 
In 1956, RCA Victor published an LP record, Guide to Jazz (LPM 1393), a compilation including 16 recordings by prominent jazz artists with liner notes by Panassiè.

Books 
Books by Panassié
 Le Jazz Hot (1934); 
 La musique de Jazz et le Swing (1943)
 Les rois du Jazz (1944)
 La véritable musique de Jazz (in French) (1946)
 The Real Jazz (English editions)
 English versions translated by Anne Sorelle Williams, adapted for American publication by Charles Edward Smith
  ; .
 1st ed.(in English), Smith & Durrell, Inc., 5th printing (1946); 
 Rev. ed.(in English), A.S. Barnes (1950); 
 Rev. ed.(in English), A.S. Barnes (1960); ; .
 Rev. ed.(in English), Jazz Book Club (1967); 
 Rev. ed.(in English), Greenwood Press (1971); 
  ; 
 Rev. ed.(in English), Greenwood Press (1976); 
 Rev. ed.(in English), Gardners Books (2007); 
 Douze années de Jazz – Souvenirs (1946)
  ; .
 Jazz Panorama (1950)
  ; .
 Discographie critique des meilleurs disques de Jazz 1st ed.,Éditions Correa (fr) (1951); New ed.,Éditions Robert Laffont (1958); 
 Histoire du vrai Jazz, Éditions Robert Laffont (1959); 
 La bataille du Jazz, Éditions Albin Michel (1965); 
 Louis Armstrong, Nouvelles Editions Latines (fr) (1969); 
 Louis Armstrong, Scribners (1971) 
 Louis Armstrong (The Roots of Jazz), Da Capo Press (1980) 
   (1954 ed.);  (1966 ed.);  (1971 ed.);  (1980 ed.); ; .
  ; .
 Guide to Jazz & Dictionary of Jazz (English editions)
 English versions by Desmond Flower (1907–1997), A.A. Gurwitch (1925–2013) (ed.)
 Beginning with 1956 English versions, intro by intro by Louis Armstrong1st ed.(in French), Éditions Robert Laffont (1954); 1st ed.(in English), Houghton Mifflin (1956); 1st ed.(in English), Cassell (1956); 1st ed.(in French), Éditions Robert Laffont (1957); 1st ed.(in English), Jazz Book Club (1959); 1st ed.(in English; microfilm), The Riverside Press (1956); New ed.(in French), Éditions Albin Michel (1971); 1st ed.(in English), Greenwood Press (1973);  New ed.(in French), Éditions Albin Michel (1980); 3rd ed.(in French), Éditions Albin Michel (1987);

Family 
Panassié spent five months in New York City in the company of Madeleine Gautier, his assistant. In 1949, they married, returned to France, and settled in Montauban at 65 Faubourg du Moustier.

Notes

References
Inline citations from Bulletin du Hot Club de France; 

Inline

1912 births
1974 deaths
French art critics
French record producers
French male non-fiction writers
People affiliated with Action Française
20th-century French male writers